In tertiary education in the United Kingdom, the term home student is used to refer to those who are eligible to pay university tuition fees at a lower rate than overseas students.  In general, British, and Irish citizens qualify for home student status only if they have been "ordinarily resident" in the UK for three years prior to the start of university. From Autumn 2021, EU citizens lost their home student status and since have had to pay the higher international tuition fees. There are other criteria to be satisfied. All other students, even British citizens, who do not qualify as "home students" are considered to be overseas students and must pay higher overseas students tuition fees at university.

Eligibility for home student status

United Kingdom students
On the first day of the first academic year of the course, to qualify as a home student, all of the following criteria must be fulfilled by the student:
Be free from any immigration restrictions (e.g. British citizenship, exercising EU Freedom of Movement Rights, indefinite leave to enter/remain, right of abode, free from immigration control (as a diplomat or member of air crew))
Be ordinarily resident in the United Kingdom
Have been ordinarily resident in the United Kingdom, Channel Islands and/or Isle of Man for the whole period of the three years directly preceding the first day of the academic course 
The main purpose for the three years' residence in the UK and Islands must not have been to receive full-time education during any part of it, unless the student is a European Union citizen (but not a British citizen) and immediately prior to the three-year period was ordinarily resident in the European Economic Area, Switzerland or qualifying overseas territories (see below).

United Kingdom students having lived in Europe

On the first day of the first academic year of the course, to qualify as a home student, all of the following criteria must be fulfilled by the student:
Be free from any immigration restrictions (e.g. British citizenship, exercising EU Freedom of Movement Rights, indefinite leave to enter/remain, right of abode, free from immigration control (as a diplomat or member of air crew))
Be ordinarily resident in the United Kingdom for a whole period of three years directly preceding the first day of the academic course
Having previous lived in the United Kingdom free from any immigration restrictions, the student later moved to the European Economic Area and/or Switzerland where he/she exercised his/her Freedom of Movement rights
If the main purpose for the three years' residence in the European Economic Area and/or Switzerland was to receive full-time education during any part of it, the student must have already been ordinarily resident in the European Economic Area and/or Switzerland immediately before the three-year period.

Irish students

Due to Irish citizens being free from any immigration restrictions and entitled to access all levels of education in the UK on terms no less favourable than those available to the citizens of the UK under the Common Travel Area agreement Irish citizens are treated the same as British citizens for education purposes.

On the first day of the first academic year of the course, to qualify as a home student, both of the following criteria must be fulfilled by Irish students:
Be ordinarily resident in the United Kingdom
Have been ordinarily resident in the United Kingdom, Channel Islands and/or Isle of Man for the whole period of the three years directly preceding the first day of the academic course.

European Union students
Until the British withdrawal from the EU, the following were the conditions that citizens of the European Union had to satisfy in order to be considered a “home student”:

On the first day of the first academic year of the course, to qualify as a home student, all of the following criteria must be fulfilled by the student:
Be a European Union citizen, or the spouse or dependent direct descendant of an EU citizen (including British citizen), or the dependent direct descendant of the spouse of an EU citizen (including British citizen), or the self-sufficient direct descendant of an EU citizen (who is not a British citizen), or the self-sufficient direct descendant of the spouse of an EU citizen (who is not a British citizen)
Have been ordinarily resident in the European Economic Area, Switzerland and/or qualifying overseas territories for the whole period of the three years directly preceding the first day of the academic course 
The main purpose for the three years' residence in the European Economic Area, Switzerland and/or qualifying overseas territories must not have been to receive full-time education during any part of it.

European Economic Area and Swiss workers and their family members
On the first day of the first academic year of the course, to qualify as a home student, all of the following criteria must be fulfilled by the student:
Be a European Economic Area or Swiss citizen (who is not a British citizen) who is resident in the United Kingdom as a worker (employed, self-employed or a frontier worker (living in the UK but returning to his/her residence in an EEA state/Switzerland other than the UK at least once a week)), or be the spouse or dependent direct descendant of such a person, or the self-sufficient direct descendant of such a person, or the dependent or self-sufficient direct descendant of such a person's spouse
Be ordinarily resident in the United Kingdom
Have been ordinarily resident in the European Economic Area, Switzerland and/or qualifying overseas territories for the whole period of the three years directly preceding the first day of the academic course

Qualifying overseas territories

The following overseas territories are considered to be 'qualifying overseas territories' in terms of determining home student status:

See also
Universities in the United Kingdom
UCAS
Education in the United Kingdom
St Anne's College, Oxford#Society of Oxford Home-Students (1879–1942)

References

External links
UK Council for International Student Affairs: Tuition fees for study in England, Wales or Northern Ireland

Higher education in the United Kingdom